Harb may refer to
 Harb (surname)
 Harb tribe in the Arabian peninsula
Talaat Harb Street in Cairo, Egypt
Fox Harb'r Golf Resort & Spa, a golf-focused resort in Nova Scotia, Canada
Beyond the Dar Al-Harb, a collection of three fantasy and science fiction stories by Gordon R. Dickson

See also
 Dar al-Harb, a division of the world in Islam